Jalan Yong Shook Lin is a prominent road in Petaling Jaya city, Selangor, Malaysia.

List of junctions

Roads in Petaling Jaya